Arthur Louis Thurlow  (May 5, 1913 – May 27, 2020) was a Canadian politician and judge. He represented the electoral district of Lunenburg County in the Nova Scotia House of Assembly from 1949 to 1953. He was a member of the Nova Scotia Liberal Party.

Early life and education
Thurlow was born in 1913 at Lunenburg, Nova Scotia, son of Maude (Kinley) and Charles Thurlow. He was educated at Dalhousie University, and was a lawyer by career. He married Mabel R. Maxwell in 1941.

Political career
Thurlow entered provincial politics in 1949, when he was elected in the dual-member Lunenburg County riding with Liberal Gordon E. Romkey. In the 1953 election, Thurlow and Romkey were both defeated, losing the riding to Progressive Conservative's Harley J. Spence and R. Clifford Levy.

Judiciary
Thurlow was appointed a judge in 1956, serving from 1956 to 1971 as puisne judge of the Exchequer Court of Canada, from 1971 to 1975 as judge of the Federal Court of Appeal, from December 4, 1975 to January 3, 1980 as associate chief justice of the Federal Court of Canada. On January 4, 1980, Thurlow was appointed chief justice of the Federal Court of Canada, serving until his retirement on May 5, 1988.

Later life
Thurlow was appointed an Officer of the Order of Canada in April 1992. Thurlow celebrated his 100th birthday in May 2013, and died on May 27, 2020.

References

1913 births
2020 deaths
Canadian centenarians
Dalhousie University alumni
Judges in Nova Scotia
Men centenarians
Nova Scotia Liberal Party MLAs
Officers of the Order of Canada
People from Lunenburg County, Nova Scotia
Judges of the Exchequer Court of Canada
Judges of the Federal Court of Canada